Olga Letyushova (born 29 December 1975) is a Russian former football forward. She has played for Energiya Voronezh, Kaluzhanka, Ryazan VDV, Rossiyanka, Zvezda Perm and ShVSM Izmailovo in the Russian Championship. She was the league's top scorer in the 2004, 2005, 2006 and 2007 seasons.

She played her first match for the Russian national team in November 1992, and took part in the 1999 and 2003 FIFA Women's World Cup World Cups and the 2001 European Championship. She is Russia's top scorer in the World Cup finals joint with Elena Fomina, with 3 goals: two against Japan in 1999 and one against Ghana in 2003.

References

1975 births
Living people
Soviet women's footballers
Russian women's footballers
Russia women's international footballers
2003 FIFA Women's World Cup players
FC Energy Voronezh players
Ryazan-VDV players
Zvezda 2005 Perm players
CSP Izmailovo players
Women's association football forwards
1999 FIFA Women's World Cup players
WFC Rossiyanka players